Paul Macari (born 23 August 1976) is a English former professional footballer who played as a forward. The son of former Scotland international Lou Macari, he played professionally for Stoke City and Huddersfield Town. His brother Mike Macari was also a professional footballer.

Career
Macari joined Stoke City as a trainee in August 1993 and made his debut as a substitute in a 1–1 away draw against Charlton in a Division One match in October 1997. He made two further substitute appearances for Stoke in the 1997–98 season before joining Sheffield United on a free transfer in 1999. He was released by Sheffield United in August 2001, having made no appearances for the first-team, and joined Huddersfield Town, where he went on to make 14 league and cup appearances, all as substitute, in the 2001–02 and 2002–03 seasons.

Macari left Huddersfield Town on a free transfer in December 2003 and joined Northern Premier League First Division club, Leek Town, where he was appointed player-coach in March 2004. Finding his playing opportunities limited, he relinquished his position as coach in August 2004 to concentrate on the playing side and joined North West Counties League club Alsager Town.

Macari rejoined Leek Town in an assistant manager/player role in 2010 but left at the end of the year following the sacking of Wayne Johnson.

Post-retirement
After leaving the game, Macari took up co-ownership of the Hanley branch of Domino's Pizza; in March 2012 he provided the Port Vale squad with free pizzas after the club hit financial difficulties.

His son Lewis is also a footballer, who was involved in Stoke City's development squads and the Scotland under-18 team as of 2020.

Career statistics

References

External links
 

1976 births
Living people
Footballers from Manchester
Scottish footballers
Association football forwards
English Football League players
Stoke City F.C. players
Sheffield United F.C. players
Huddersfield Town A.F.C. players
Leek Town F.C. players
Alsager Town F.C. players
English people of Scottish descent
English people of Italian descent